Harsh Times is a 2005 American action crime film written and directed by David Ayer in his directorial debut. Set in South Central Los Angeles, the film stars Christian Bale and Freddy Rodriguez. The film was distributed by Metro-Goldwyn-Mayer and Bauer Martinez Entertainment. Ayer says that the film's characters are largely based on the people he knew when he lived in South Central Los Angeles.

Plot
Jim Davis (Christian Bale) is a former U.S. Army Ranger and GWOT veteran who suffers from PTSD. Jim has a Mexican girlfriend, Marta (Tammy Trull), whom he is determined to marry and bring into the United States to start a life together. With this in mind, Jim returns to Los Angeles, California.

In Los Angeles, Jim meets up with his best friend Mike Alonzo (Freddy Rodriguez). Mike's longtime girlfriend, Sylvia (Eva Longoria), a young attorney, is "on the warpath" over his failure to get a job (his previous job was outsourced) and she encourages Jim to help Mike hand out resumes.  After being denied a position in the Los Angeles Police Department for failing the psychological profile, Jim gets drunk with Mike.

The two visit Jim's ex-girlfriend, but when her current boyfriend shows up, a fight ensues in which the boyfriend is backed up by a group of friends. Jim is able to get the upper hand and when Mike produces a gun, they subdue the men and rob them of their possessions, including marijuana and a handgun which they later decide to sell. Jim later leaves messages on Mike's answering machine with several different voices, pretending to be companies responding to his resume.

The next day, Jim goes to visit Mike and finds Sylvia in a good mood due to the fake callbacks. Jim and Mike go to a "paisa" bar to try to sell the gun, but leave after their potential buyer is killed. Mike is horrified, but Jim is strangely excited by witnessing death again.

When Mike arrives back home drunk, Sylvia is upset, so Mike plays back the answering machine, unaware that his friend didn't hang up early enough and his voice is heard on the tape. Sylvia is enraged and throws Mike out. He stays at Jim's place. Jim gets shortlisted for a position with the Department of Homeland Security, but, after cheating to pass a urine test, he fails a polygraph test due to a question about his drug use. The only hope left for him is a government agent working out of Colombia, who appreciates Jim's ability to "get things done"; Jim eventually accepts the position but is warned that he must not marry a foreigner. Jim is told to report to FLETC in a few days. Meanwhile, Mike gets a job with a company managed by an old friend.

Mike goes to visit Sylvia and tells her that he has a job for real. She calms down and the two make love. Impatient, Jim goes inside and tells Sylvia that Mike is coming to Mexico with him for the weekend, as it is their last chance to hang out. Sylvia is angry and against the idea, but Mike decides to go with Jim and Toussant to Mexico.

In Mexico, the trio attend a big party where Marta reveals she is pregnant, and Jim responds violently, threatening to punch her in the stomach and shoot her in the head. Seeing this from afar, Mike urges Toussant and Jim to leave for home. After Jim drives home dangerously in a belligerent state, Toussant urges Jim to get help and will cut off all contact until he does so. Afterward, Jim reveals to Mike he is transporting 20 kilos of marijuana. When Mike protests, Jim pulls a gun on him, flashing back, before breaking down in tears, horrified at what he is becoming. Mike, filled with pity for his friend, agrees to accompany Jim to the deal. When they arrive, they realize one of the buyers was the same man they had earlier robbed.

Hostility ensues with both Jim and the other gang members pulling out guns, resulting in the other man's death. The other members of the buying party plead for their lives, but Jim kills them while suffering flashbacks. While Jim and Mike are escaping in the car, a man comes from the house and shoots at the car with an Armsel Striker; Jim is hit in the back and face and subsequently paralyzed.

He urges Mike to "step up" and shoot him, thus ending his suffering. After some hesitation, Mike and Jim say their goodbyes and Mike ends up killing Jim. The film ends with Mike returning to Sylvia. They embrace together as Mike breaks down crying.

Cast
 Christian Bale as Jim Davis
 Freddy Rodriguez as Mike Alonzo
 Eva Longoria as Sylvia Alonzo
 Tammy Trull as Marta
 Terry Crews as Darrell
 Samantha Esteban as Letty
 Tania Verafield as Patty
 Noel Gugliemi as 'Flaco'
 Chaka Forman as Toussant
 Adriana Millan as Rita
 César García Gómez as 'Listo'
 Geo Corvera as 'Wilo'
 Blue Mesquita as Leo
 Craig Ricci Shaynak as Agent Doug Gillespie
 Michael Monks as Agent Hollenbreck
 J.K. Simmons as Agent Richards
 Armando Riesco as Alex
 Emilio Rivera as Eddy
 Sonia Iris Lozada as Gracie
 Daniel Edward Mora as Joe 'Crazy Joe'
 Anthony "Citric" Campos as Casper
 Abel Soto as Chucky 'Lil Chucky'
 Robert Larabee as 'Big Shadow'
 Paul Renteria as Ranchero
 Brisa as Lina
 Violeta Monroy as Vicky
 Kenneth Choi as Fujimoto
 Barry Colvert as Polygraph Expert

Reception
Christian Bale won praise for his portrayal of Jim Davis.  The website's critical consensus reads, "Despite a dedicated performance by Christian Bale, Harsh Times suffers from a heavy-handed and overly bleak plot." According to Metacritic, which calculated a weighted average score of 56 out of 100 based on 24 critics, the film received "mixed or average reviews".

References

External links
 
 
 
 
 David Ayer Interview 
 Christian Bale Interview
 About.com  (links to several interviews)

2005 films
American crime drama films
American crime thriller films
American gangster films
2000s crime drama films
2005 crime thriller films
Films set in Los Angeles
Iraq War films
Rangers
Films directed by David Ayer
Films with screenplays by David Ayer
Metro-Goldwyn-Mayer films
Films scored by Graeme Revell
Films produced by Andrea Sperling
2005 directorial debut films
Films set in Koreatown, Los Angeles
2000s English-language films
Films about post-traumatic stress disorder
2000s American films